Non-Summit, also known as Abnormal Summit, is a South Korean television program on JTBC which first aired on July 7, 2014. The show features a panel of non-Korean men, living in South Korea, who debate on various topics and "Korean culture, through the eyes of a foreigner," in a talk show format, in the Korean language. The show concluded its first season on December 4, 2017 with Episode 177, with no set date for a new season.

Development
The show started productions with veteran Lim Jung-ah, who produced Star Edition, and co-produced, with Yeo Woon-hyuk, variety shows MBC's Radio Star, and JTBC's Men's Stuff, after coming over to the cable company, from the major networks, in 2011.

The show's format, presented with humor, is meant to emulate a meeting of world leaders, like Doctors Without Borders, i.e. "Youth Without Borders"; or the United Nations, or G11, and is hosted by Jun Hyun-moo "Chairman", Yoo Se-yoon "Secretary General", and Sung Si-kyung "Chairman", with guest appearances by South Korean celebrities, guest "representatives", who announce the weekly topics. The stated mission: "The youth group, without borders, Non-Summit, is a variety show, that strives for peace and security, for the world's youth, by speaking on agendas, and debating with abnormals, who insist they're representatives."

The show has been compared to KBS2's 2006 Global Talk Show (Misuda), which had female foreigners discussing global issues. Host Yoo Se-yoon said their new show would go a step further than getting to know one another's cultures, and would include problem solving, coming up with "what's better, together." Lim said the show's in-depth discussions made fluency in Korean the number one standard for casting the global guests. Lim said, "The cast of foreign people was because, although Korea is reinforcing its position on the global stage right now, it still is just one country among many others. And I thought perceiving the problems of Koreans who are in their 20s and 30s, in a universal perspective, was necessary."

Production changes
Along with 7 new and 2 returning representatives, a reorganization of the show (ep. 103 onward) also introduced some changes to the show's production crew. Chief Producer (CP) Lim Jung-ah was replaced by Cho Seung-wook, who created KBS2 Yahaengsung or Night Star, and Hidden Singer after joining JTBC.

Cast

Original cast
The show's format of a summit, refers to the foreign cast, eleven at time the show first aired, as "Representatives" from their individual countries, who make up an International panel. Promotions and news reports noted several of them for the notoriety they had made for themselves prior to the show:
United Kingdom's James Hooper, National Geographic explorer and mountain climber; Canada's Guillaume Patry, professional StarCraft pro-gamer; Japan's Takuya Terada, a model and member of K-pop multi-national group Cross Gene; Italy's Alberto Mondi, a Fiat foreign car dealer; China's TV announcer Zhang Yu'an; and United States's Tyler Rasch, a scholar at Seoul National University, who runs a webzine about Seoul.

Others came to South Korea, as students and young workers: Belgium's Julian Quintart, former student with Rotary Youth Exchange, singer/actor/TV personality; France's Robin Deiana, former exchange student at Konkuk University, model; and Australia's Daniel Snoeks, the youngest, followed by Terada, is best known for his tattoos.

Ghana's Sam Okyere, who has appeared on other variety shows in South Korea, a graduate of Sogang University, and official ambassador for seaweed in Wando in South Korea, became known for his mischievous behavior. Turkey's Enes Kaya, who acted in the Korean film Haunters, became an outgoing debater on the panel.

In an interview about the show's "debate" style, Julian Quintart said he hoped the program to be an introduction to South Korea to the debate culture, and expressed the importance of having healthy discussions, with consideration of the opponent's view. Takuya Terada addressed the sensitive topic of the Asian countries, that come up in the debates, "Japan, Korea, and China are all close to each other, but if you look at their history, they’re really far apart. Since the histories are all different, it can only be a delicate topic, but through this program, I’m glad we can talk about it and take the time to understand each other.”

2014
On Episode 5, Daniel Lindemann from Germany, who studied Korean language at University of Bonn and works at a Korean company; replaced United Kingdom's James Hooper, who has left for Australia to work on a PhD.

Visiting "intern" representatives, made up of male foreign students and workers in South Korea, were added to the cast, and filled in for vacationing, or otherwise missing, representatives on Episodes 11, 12, 13, and 17.

On October 23, 2014, media reported that Daniel Snoeks would be leaving the show to return to his studies in Australia, and had taped a final appearance for the Episode 17, October 27 show. One of the show's directors, Kim Hee-jung confirmed the report; and the news stated that plans were being made to replace the empty seat with visiting "intern" representatives to show a "more diverse culture."

On December 2, 2014, media reported Enes Kaya's alleged involvement in a scandal. Kaya released a statement denying the allegations, but said that he would voluntarily leave the show to not cause damages.

2015
On January 6, 2015, media reported that visiting intern representatives Ilya Belyakov, Blair Williams, and Sujan Shakya would become fixed cast members, changing the show's original G11 format to a G12 setup. Russia's Belyakov, the visiting intern on Episode 20, studied at Yonsei University, and works as a medical translator. He has been in Korea for eleven years and said he wants to "break prejudices of Russia" and talk about Russia's relationship with America and China. Williams, from Australia, who was on Episode 22, and also attended Yonsei University, after double majoring in business management and Korean at University of Queensland, works as a marketing strategist. And Nepal's Shakya, from Episode 27, has been in Korea since 2010, studies urban planning at Dankook University and hopes to bring awareness to Nepal and teach others about his country.

On June 20, 2015, Director Kim Hee-jung announced that six members of the cast, Belyakov, Quintart, Shakya, Deiana, Williams and Terada, would be leaving. She said the change was in order to introduce new cultures and for viewers to hear the reactions of other countries; with new members to be announced on July 6. The six members said farewells, in the show's one-year anniversary retrospective, on June 29, Episode 52, and later, met with fans and planned an August concert. Media reported viewers' mixed reactions to the cast changes, in particular, from a fan club of Russian representative Belyakov, and opinions that the cast was already doing well, with Belyakov and Quintart's contributions especially noted.

The new cast announced on July 1, 2015, included Samy Rashad El-Baz from Egypt, a graduate student in Korean language and literature at Seoul National University and a previous intern who appeared on Episode 11; and first time to appear: Przemysław Krompiec, Poland (Chung-Ang University doctoral student and model), Carlos Gorito, Brazil (Education Advisor at the Embassy of Brazil in Seoul; Science and Technology Section and Academic Exchange Programs), Nikolai Johnsen, Norway (graduate student in international studies at Korea University), Andreas Varsakopoulos, Greece (UMass Boston M.A. in applied linguistics, high school English teacher in Cheongju) and Yuta Nakamoto, Japan (a K-pop idol trainee with SM Rookies).

In September 2015, Director Kim Hee-jung announced the show would be adding more diversity by scheduling appearances with new "visiting intern" representatives, including those already invited from Thailand and Mexico.

At the end of December 2015, Japanese representative Nakamoto left the show after Episode 78 to prepare for his debut as a singer with his contracted company, S.M. Entertainment.

2016
In the beginning of June 2016, media announced cast (and production) changes expected for Episode 103, with nine members leaving - Zhang, Rasch and Okyere, (on the show from Episode 1), Lindemann (joined on Episode 5) and Krompiec, Gorito, Johnsen, Rashad El Baz and Varsakopoulos (joined on Episode 53). One reviewer said the show would have trouble finding a substitute for the consistently intelligent level of discussion Rasch had brought to the show.

Episode 103 began with a reorganization of nine representatives which included two remaining members Patry and Mondi. They were joined by new members: Mark Tetto (United States), (B.S. chemistry Princeton University, MBus Wharton, Chief Financial Officer Vingle), a prior intern on Episode 24, and first time to appear: "Lucky" Abhishek Gupta (India), (CEO agriculture importing company), Zahid Hussain (Pakistan), (B.S. electrical engineering Korea University, M.B.A. Sungkyunkwan University, Project Manager CK Solar Co.), Mao Yifeng (China), (studied Chonnam National University, Executive at wedding planning company and DJ), Aurelien Loubert (France), (French instructor at Hankuk University of Foreign Studies), Alex Mazzucchelli (Switzerland) (B.S. economics University of Essex, M.S. international business economics City University London, Strategy Manager Enso Group), and Niklas Klabunde (Germany) (East Asian studies Heidelberg University, model).

After the new cast were introduced on Episode 103, subsequent episodes no longer previewed starring cast members. After Episode 105, three additional visiting intern/representatives were added as recurring cast, Christian Burgos (Mexico), (video producer), previously on Episode 68 and newer interns, Ogi Hitoshi (Japan), (Keio University graduate, animation company emoticon designer), and Wang Xinlin (China), (Dalian Jiaotong University electrical engineering graduate, Seoul National University mechanical engineering doctoral student).

On July 22, 2016, Mondi responded about the cast changes and he and Patry being the two selected to stay, "There were so many other members who speak better Korean than us....and there were other members who were funnier."  About the changed atmosphere, he said, "Since different people are on, a new kind of Non-Summit may appear."

In late August 2016, Chinese representative Mao Yifeng, who appeared on Episodes 103 and 104, was deleted from the show's cast list and promotional posters.

2017
On the 144th episode it was announced that India representative Lucky Abhishek Gupta would leave the show due to personal business.

List of episodes, topics and guests

Season 1 (first part)

2014

2015

2016

Season 1 (second part, after reorganization)

2016

2017 (ep. 131ep. 177)

Episode firsts
Outdoor filming
On September 2015, the show announced that the episode 65, September 28 Chuseok Special would be the first outdoor filming for the show, to take place in a traditional hanok house in Gyeonggi-do with the cast dressed in holiday hanbok and celebrating with traditional games and foods of the world. Again, on August 29, 2016, part of episode 113 was filmed at representative Mark Tetto's hanok home in Bukchon Hanok Village, with some of the cast.
V-app fan meeting
On October 5, 2015, cast members met with fans on South Korea's Naver V-app for the first time, just prior to the airing of episode 66, with Patry, Mondi, Zhang and Lindemann introducing the Thai intern. And again on November 30, 2015, on episode 74, Yoo, Patry, Zhang, Krompiec introduced the Cambodian intern.
Female interns
On July 18, 2016, episode 107, the fifth show of Season Two, included the first two female interns as guests, Adela Borowiak from Poland and Najafizadeh Sudeh from Iran.
Hollywood actor intern/guest
On August 22, 2016, episode 112, England's Simon Pegg, the first Hollywood actor, appeared as an "intern/representative" on the show.
Minor age guest
On October 3, 2016, 17-year-old rapper, and television personality MC Gree, the show's first minor guest, discussed wanting to be an adult on Episode 118.
Out of country filming
On September 25, 2017, episode 168 was a special Chuseok travel show with hosts Jun and Yoo meeting brothers of cast members Loubert and Ogi in Tokyo and Kurashiki, Japan, respectively.

Spin-off

Where Is My Friend's Home

On February 7, 2015, JTBC aired a new reality television-travel show Where Is My Friend's Home where the same cast and presenters visit the various countries of the foreign representatives.

Reception

Media and ratings
In August 2014, Star News accounted the successful reception of the show to the majority of the foreign panel already knowing about Korea's cultural experiences and history. This enabled Korean audiences to have the chance to think more of Korea itself.

Episode 10 received the show's highest national viewership rating, to date, by Nielsen Korea, of 6%. Episode 11 ratings rose to 6.8% and exceeded the previous high.

On July 7, 2015, a Korea Herald reviewer of the show's first airing of six new cast members, complimented them for having a serious political debate on issues like the Greek financial crisis, Sino-Norwegian relations and the history of Japanese nationalism; saying they demonstrated "a seasoned maturity and the potential for a significant impact beyond simple entertainment."

On November 17, 2017, as the show prepared to go on hiatus after Episode 177, Korea JoongAng Daily reporter Hong You-kyoung said, "The show’s ratings have remained steady, at about 3 percent, which is relatively high for a program on a cable channel".

Original cast popularity
Due to the show's popularity, some of the panelists also appeared on other shows, Enes Kaya on Magic Eye, Enes Kaya and Julian Quintart on JTBC's Hidden Singer, Tyler Rasch was a surprise guest on "Arguments," another JTBC talk show about current affairs, and Sam Okyere and Enes Kaya were on the Happy Together "Hot People Special." Some appeared in fashion magazines, including Woman Sense, Star, Ceci, Allure, Arena, Grazia, and Ize. Also, due to his appearances on the show, Julian Quintart's musical group, Yann & Julian, was invited to perform at Global Gathering Korea on October 4, 2014. Julian Quintart, Enes Kaya, and Daniel Snoeks appeared in skits on Saturday Night Live Korea. Daniel Snoeks acted in a music video for kpop girl group AOA and Takuya Terada in Hyorin and Joo Young's music video. On November 13, 2014, Takuya Terada, Enes Kaya, Julian Quintart and show host Jun Hyun-moo all appeared as MCs and award presenters on the MelOn Music Awards at Seoul's Olympic Park Gymnastics Stadium. And some of the panelists were retained for commercial endorsements and advertisements, Julian Quintart, Sam Okyere, Robin Deiana and Daniel Snoeks; although Tyler Rasch and Zhang Yuan had their commercial activities limited by the Ministry of Justice, after problems with their visa's were worked out by JTBC.

By the end of May 2015, the cast were still benefiting from the show's popularity. Zhang had signed on as an entertainer with SM C&C, and Mondi, Lindemann and Patry were contracted with a management agency, Dramahouse and J Contents Hub, founded by JTBC. Several continued to be cast on variety shows, including Okyere on Real Men 2, and Rasch on Hot Brain: Problematic Men. Terada starred in his first Korean drama The Lover, Quintart had a cameo in another K-drama The Girl Who Sees Smells, and Deiana's rapping was featured on Sosim Boys' "Shining Star" and Crayon Pop's "What Are You Doing?"

Impact and social responsibility

2014
One of the original cast members, Daniel Snoeks, whose hands and much of his body were tattooed, and his appearance on the show, was said to contribute to "the cause" of tattoo artists in South Korea, where injecting ink into the skin can only be done legally by qualified doctors, despite the "growing fashion trend." Snoeks said people encountering him on the subway used to move away and comment that his tattoos were "disgusting" or "scary" and after he appeared on the show, people wanted to take pictures with him.

In September, KOCCA said the show "runs a fierce debate on Korean culture" and "their speeches frequently become a hot issue among young viewers, sometimes for being too radical and sometimes too conservative. However, viewers can at least think of both sides of opinions." KOCCA credits the show for not just including "white people from advanced countries" that Koreans are already familiar with, but also inviting guests from diverse countries with varied cultures.

In October, Korea.net said the show debates on a wide range of current affairs, with topics that are "sympathetic issues for most people," and the non-Korean panelists, in their adopted home from four to fifteen years, give opinions on things Korean, with answers so stereotypically "Korean," that it makes viewers laugh. The article adds that more TV shows are adding non-Koreans and viewers are responding positively to the "fun" and "genuine" perspectives they bring to the shows, and accounting the appeal to a growing international audience of non-Korean youths. The article further poses that this casting trend reflects a Korean society which is being affected by the influences of globalization, and starting to welcome interactions and communication with non-Koreans, accepting them as true members of the community, and, as a result, bringing new energy to a Korean society that once prided itself on being "a nation with one single ethnicity."

In November, Yale University's YaleGlobal Online, published by the MacMillan Center, that "explores the implications of the growing interconnectedness of the world," republished an article from The Straits Times, with a commentary. They said, "South Korean television stardom is no longer the exclusive domain of Korean nationals. The emergence of foreign stars on Korean television programs draws international attention to South Korea’s entertainment and media industries. Hailing from Australia, France, Ghana, the United States and other countries, foreign stars are breaking down barriers in Korean TV...The actors also serve as cultural ambassadors for their home countries and can find themselves deconstructing stereotypes about other parts of the world. Ghanaian actor Sam Okyere states that his television character helps generate more nuanced perspectives on Africa." The Straits Times article, which interviewed Okyere, stated that the "chatty Okyere has snagged a regular gig...on new talk show Abnormal Summit on Korean cable network JTBC," and said that Okyere "recalls earlier appearances where he was on the receiving end of jokes about his African heritage," adding that he hopes to do his part as a "black representative" and create awareness about his home country and adopted home South Korea.

On December 1, one million copies of a show calendar sold out within four minutes of release online. Donations were given to the Beautiful Store, whose chairman Myunghee Hong visited the set on January 11, 2015, for a ceremony with cast. Also in December, Seoul Mayor Park Won-soon was "inspired by popular TV show Abnormal Summit on cable channel JTBC" and scheduled an "informal round-table meeting" with ten foreign residents for February 2015. Called a "Seoul-style Non-summit", the forum was planned for international residents to share their experiences, including inconveniences in daily living in Seoul, in an open and "frank" talk with the Mayor.

2015
On March 10, the Seoul Metropolitan Government appointed Julian Quintart and Robin Deiana, two "foreign entertainers" who "gained popularity after appearing on cable network JTBC talk show Non-Summit," as honorary ambassadors for the ICLEI world congress global network meeting of over 1,000 cities, which is committed to building a sustainable future, and took place at Seoul's Dongdaemun Design Plaza and Seoul Plaza from April 8–12. Also in April, Tyler Rasch and Ilya Belyakov, Honorary Culture Sharing Ambassadors of the Korea Foundation, attended a ceremony for the new "Koreans and Foreigners Together" program. Sujan Shakya, having hosted his country, Nepal, in April, on the spin-off Where Is My Friend's Home, became an active spokesperson for JTBC and his alma mater Dankook University for outreach following the April 2015 Nepal earthquake and the May 2015 Nepal earthquake, along with intern Mark Tetto.

In September, Mondi joined ex-members Hooper and Shakya for the "One Mile Closer" charity cycling tour, led by Hooper.

On November 29, Quintart, Belyakov and Shakya participated in the "Global Friendship Festival" organized by a foreign students' group at KBS Sports World. Also in November, Belyakov became a contributing columnist for Korea.net.

On December 7, Deiana returned to the show as one of the guests to discuss terrorism in his home country France. On December 14, the Asia-Pacific Centre of Education for International Understanding (APCEIU) published interviews of Shakya and Varsakopoulos about cultural diversity and their respective countries. A Muslim cast member, Samy Rashad El-Baz, wrote a December 24 editorial for JTBC's affiliated newspaper, JoongAng Ilbo, where other cast members have contributed anecdotal and cultural perspectives since the show's debut. In the article, and in a follow-up Internet show with more cast members and JoongAng Ilbo editorial staff, Rashad El-baz discussed the Islam religion, terrorism and Islamophobia. Also in December, twelve cast members continued the show's charity work with a fan-connected V-app event at Sinchon's Tom N Toms, with contributions going to JoongAng Ilbo's jointly funded welfare program for low-income children, We Start.

2016
On January 12, representatives Guillaume Patry, Alberto Mondi, Zhang Yuan and Tyler Rasch, along with Psy and violinist Clara-Jumi Kang, received the Corea Image Communication Institute awards, for "introducing Korean culture to the rest of the world through a unique perspective and interesting debate."
In January, Daniel Lindemann and Sam Okyere became part of an international cast of the KBS2 K-drama Moorim School, with a plot based on a "mystical martial-arts high school" and an appeal as a "global youth action drama". Lindemann and Okyere were staff at the school, which "was built to protect and uphold world peace". Also, through January, prior cast members Hooper, Deiana, Terada, Williams, Shakya and former intern Tetto were part of the travel reality show Where Is My Friend's Home visiting some of their home countries.

On February 12, cast members Alberto Mondi, Sam Okyere and Nikolai Johnsen joined the "K-Smile" campaign, part of the Ministry of Culture, Sports and Tourism's tourism promotion in Myeong-dong to support the "2016-2018 Visit Korea Year" and the "Korea Grand Sale."

On March 19, eight cast members participated in the 2016 Earth Hour campaign as celebrity supporters. Also on that date, intern Tetto, a member of the Korea Legacy Committee that helps poverty-stricken elderly Koreans, participated in their White Day fund-raiser for contributions to the Seoul Senior Welfare Center.

On April 22, Quintart and Ha Ji-won, president of the Green Education Institutions and director of the National Assembly Forum on Climate Change, received awards for their contributions as goodwill ambassadors for climate change, at a joint Earth Day and Paris Agreement celebration hosted by the European Union delegation to Korea. Also in April, Rasch was chosen as the WWF-Korea Brand Ambassador, and on April 24, ran in Korea's 50k, to help raise funds for Operation Smile.

In May, present and former cast members Patry, Rasch, Deiana, Johnsen, Williams, Terada and Okyere appeared at a premiere event for an upcoming movie Canola;

On July 12, Mondi and Tetto spoke on a panel "Korean Wave 3.0" along with Professor Seo Kyoung-duk and comedian Seo Kyung-seok, at the 8th World Korean Educators Conference hosted by the King Sejong Institute at the National Museum of Korea. On July 14, Carlos Gorito was named Gangwon-do honorary ambassador and set to promote Pyeongchang 2018 at Brazil's Rio 2016.

In September, Tetto was selected as Ambassador for the 9th Annual Senior Film Festival, an October event sponsored by the Seoul Senior Welfare Center.

Ratings
In the ratings below, the highest rating for the show is in red, and the lowest rating for the show is in blue each year.

2014

Ratings released by AGB Nielsen Korean and TnMS.

2015

Ratings released by AGB Nielsen Korean.

2016

Ratings released by AGB Nielsen Korean.

2017

Ratings released by AGB Nielsen Korean.

International franchises

Turkish franchise

In 2014, ATV purchased the rights for a Turkish adaptation of the show, titled Elin Oğlu, which premiered on 21 March 2015.

Chinese franchises
In 2015, two Chinese adaptations of the show premiered.

Hubei Television produced Informal Talks which has aired from 24 April 2015 to present. Jiangsu Broadcasting Corporation produced A Bright World (世界青年说), which aired from 16 April 2015 to 13 April 2017.

Awards and nominations

References

External links

 
 

 
2014 South Korean television series debuts
South Korean television talk shows
South Korean variety television shows
Korean-language television shows
Multiculturalism in South Korea